Edward Génicot, born at Antwerp (Belgium), 18 June 1856, and died at Leuven (Belgium), 21 February 1900, was a Belgian Jesuit priest and moral theologian.

Life
After a course of studies at the Jesuit college in Antwerp, he entered the Society of Jesus on 27 September 1872. He was successively professor of humanities and of rhetoric at the Jesuit school of Ghent and at Antwerp. After being ordained priest and sustaining a public defense in all theology, taught first canon law and then moral theology at the Jesuit theological faculty of Louvain, from 1889 until his death.

Works
In 1896 he published his "Theologiæ Moralis Institutiones" in which the sixth edition, in harmony with recent decrees of the Holy See, appeared in 1909 (at Brussels). Father Génicot drew his inspiration chiefly from the large work of Ballerini-Palmieri. His own work follows principles to their conclusions and sets down the conduct confessors may legitimately follow in the confessional.

Another work, "Casus Conscientiæ", was published after the author's death. The third edition (1906) appeared with additions and corrections in 1909 (Louvain). These 'cases of conscience' were gathered in large part from actual experience.

References

Attribution

1856 births
1900 deaths
19th-century Belgian Jesuits
Jesuit theologians
19th-century Belgian Roman Catholic theologians